The 22nd Miss Chinese International Pageant, Miss Chinese International Pageant 2010 was held on November 5, 2010. Tianjin, China would host the pageant for the first time. TVB would broadcast the pageant one day later, delayed, for the first time ever. Miss Chinese International 2009 Christine Kuo of Toronto, Ontario, Canada crowned her successor, Eliza Sam of Vancouver, British Columbia, Canada at the end of the three-hour pageant, marking Vancouver's fifth win.

Pageant information
The slogan to this year's pageant is "Chinese Beautiful Posture, Beautiful Shadows of Red Dust" 「中華美態  紅塵儷影」.  This year marks the first time the pageant is held in the fall since 1989.  The Masters of Ceremonies are Carol Cheng and Derek Li from Hong Kong, as well as Jin Liu from Tianjin. Special performers include Raymond Lam and Leo Ku.

Results

Special awards
Miss Friendship: Lu Bai 白鷺  (Foshan)
Miss Home Beauty: Belle Theng 陳美妤 (Kuala Lumpur)

Contestant list

Contestants that received media attention
Vancouver Eliza Sam was the hot favorite for being the cutest girl out of the contestants. She won the pageant due to the four votes from Joe Ma Tak Chung, Sonija Kwok Sin Lei, Kate Tsui Chi San and Lau Yang.
Sydney contestant Melanie Lu was 1 of only 2 girls with perfect proportions of 36"-24½"-36½",the other was Toronto contestant Candy Chang 35"-23"-35"  and was publicly lauded by the Hong Kong media for her voluptuous figure and breasts.

References

External links
 Miss Chinese International Pageant 2010 Official Site

TVB
2010 beauty pageants
2010 in China
Beauty pageants in China
Miss Chinese International Pageants
November 2010 events in China